Emilus S. Goodell (1848–1920) was a Republican member of the Wisconsin State Assembly. He was elected to the Assembly in 1896. Additionally, he was Sheriff, Supervisor and Chairman of the County Board of Vernon County, Wisconsin. Goodell was born on May 3, 1848, in Oswego County, New York.

References

1848 births
1920 deaths
People from Oswego County, New York
People from Vernon County, Wisconsin
County supervisors in Wisconsin
Wisconsin sheriffs
Republican Party members of the Wisconsin State Assembly